Dua, or duaa, is the Islamic term for the act of supplication.

DUA or dua or duaa may also refer to:

Acronyms and codes
 Democrat Union of Africa, an alliance of centre-right political parties in Africa
 Democratic Unionist Association, the youth wing of the Democratic Unionist Party in Northern Ireland
 Democratic Union of Albanians, an Albanian minority political party
 Distinguished Unit Award, an award issued to outstanding JROTC units
 ISO 639 code for the Duala language
 IATA code for Durant Regional Airport – Eaker Field in Oklahoma, United States

People
 Kwaku Dua I Panyin (circa 1797–1867), Asantehene
 Harminder Dua, Indian–British medical researcher
 Vera Dua, Flemish member of the Groen! political party
 Vinod Dua, Indian television presenter
 Mallika Dua, Indian comedian
 Dua Lipa (born 1995), English singer and songwriter
 Dua Malik (born 1994), Pakistani singer, songwriter and television personality
 Dua Saleh, Sudanese-American singer, poet, and actor

Other meanings
 Raising hands in Dua, a gesture during Dua in Islam
 Đạo Dừa, the Coconut Religion in Vietnam
 Dua, a subgroup under Arora, a Punjabi community
 Dua, a fictional character in The Gods Themselves by Isaac Asimov
 Duaa (Geo TV), a 2015 Pakistani television drama serial that aired on Geo Entertainment
 Duaa (song), a Hindi-language song from the 2012 Bollywood film, Shanghai

See also
 
 
 Do'a or Do'ah, a musical group founded by Randy Armstrong
 Dual (disambiguation)
 Duas (disambiguation)